K M Baharul Islam is presently the Chairperson of Centre of Excellence in Public Policy and Government at Indian Institute of Management Kashipur. He served as the Dean (Academics) during 2019-2021 at the same institute. He was elected as a Fellow of the Royal Asiatic Society of Great Britain and Ireland on 18 March 2020. In October 2021, he was invited as a Visiting Professor at the London School of Economics.

Appointments
During 2016-2018 he was a Fellow at the Indian Institute of Advanced Study, Shimla, India where he worked on Translingualism and Migration.  He specialises in the areas of Development Program Evaluations, Policy Analysis, Institutional Development, ICT Policies and e-Government in Asia and Africa. Prof Islam holds the position of Professor of Communications at Indian Institute of Management Kashipur. He is a member of the Board of Governors of Indian Institute of Management Kashipur and the Academic Council of Aligarh Muslim University.

He is a Fellow at the US India Policy Institute in Washington DC. He has been awarded Shastri Institutional Collaborative Research Grant (2018–20) by Shastri Indo-Canadian Institute for the project on “Gender Diversity in Boardrooms and Business Schools” in collaboration with Rupa Banerjee of Ryerson University (now Toronto Metropolitan University), Canada. He has also been sanctioned an action research scheme project on Continuing Legal Education by the Ministry of Law and Justice, Government of India (2018-2019). His conducted a Bangladesh-India study on "Co-deployment of Optical Fiber Cables along the Asian Highways and Trans-Asian Railways for E-resilience" under the Asia-Pacific Information Superhighway initiative of the United Nation's Economic and Social Commission for Asia and the Pacific (UNESCAP), Bangkok.

Islam was selected as an International Fellow at the King Abdullah International Center for Interreligious and Intercultural Dialogue in Vienna, popularly known as KAICIID Dialogue Centre for 2015–2016.  He served as the Chairman and CEO of the South Asia Development Gateway set up by the Development Gateway from 2007 to 2012. He studied for his first BA and MA at the Aligarh Muslim University. He completed his 2nd and 3rd post-graduate bachelor's degrees in Education (BEd) and Law (LLB) from Assam University. He did his PhD on "New Technologies for English Language Classrooms" from Tezpur University, India. He did LLM (IT & Telecom Law) at the Strathclyde Law School, University of Strathclyde with a UK Telecom Academy Fellowship. He did his post-doctoral studies on Internet-based instructions at Asian Institute of Technology, Bangkok. Islam completed his MBA from I. K. Gujral Punjab Technical University and a second PhD in Transitional justice from Assam Don Bosco University, Guwahati. He is an alumnus of Harvard Business School, GLOCOLL (2013-14 Batch). and University of Bern, IPDET (2018 Batch).

Prof Islam led a major regional capacity building program called "Environmental Assessment Capacity Building in South Asia" funded by World Bank during 2014-2016. Under the project he planned and successfully piloted a Green MBA Specialization within the post-graduate program in management as Indian Institute of Management Kashipur. He was the principal Investigator for the project on "Performance Indicators for Subordinate Courts and Suggestive Policy / Procedural Changes to Reduce Civil Case Pendency" funded by Ministry of Law & Justice, Government of India project under research in Judicial reform scheme. He was the Project Director for a major research project on Communication Strategy for Disaster management in Uttarakhand state in India. Communication is one of the key issues during any emergency, and pre-planning of communications is critical. Miscommunication can easily result in emergency events escalating unnecessarily. This is a major project funded by the Indian Council of Social Science Research after the 2013 North India floods.

Career
He started his career as a faculty in Humanities at National Institute of Technology, Silchar where he taught from 1994 to 2002. The institute was formerly known as Regional Engineering College, Silchar. He initiated and headed the Center for Educational Technology at the National Institute of Technology Silchar, India where he taught for eight years. He was part of the faculty during the initial years of development of Kigali Institute of Science, Technology & Management (KIST), Rwanda (2000–2001) which is now known as College of Science and Technology.

Islam also worked as a Reader at the National Council of Educational Research and Training, New Delhi (2002). In 2002–2003, Baharul Islam was seconded to the Addis Ababa University as an associate professor. To serve the grassroots communities, Islam initiated an NGO in Assam, India called PFI Foundation, and served as its Honorary Executive Director. While working for the Foundation, he received two Certificates of Recognition from World Bank Development Marketplace Award in 2003 and 2007 for his projects on the Education of Disabled Children in Ethiopia and Mobile Eye Care Clinic in Northeast India respectively.

Baharul Islam worked earlier as an ICT Policy & eGovernment Consultant at the United Nations Economic Commission for Africa (UNECA), Addis Ababa and United Nations Economic and Social Commission for Asia and the Pacific (UNESCAP), Bangkok. He has been involved in various UN projects in Asia and Africa in countries including Cambodia, Rwanda, Ethiopia, The Gambia, Ghana, Uganda, Kenya, Sudan, Egypt, Tanzania and Sierra Leone. His publications include e -Government Strategy for the Gambia (published by UNECA) and a National ICT Policy called NICI Policy and Plans for The Gambia commissioned by UNECA. He wrote a chapter in the Digital Encyclopedia on ICT & Economic Development.  He was registered as an Advocate by the Bar Council of India in 2004 and enrolled as member of the Bar Association at the Gauhati High Court.

Publications
 Exploring the Status of Community Information and Training for Disaster Preparation and Mitigation Practices: An Appraisal of 2013 Flash Flood in Uttarakhand. In International Journal of Emergency Management (2018): (Co-Auth: Asif Khan and Archan Mitra)
 Predictive Analytics for Reducing Human-Animal Conflict (2017) (co-Author: Nitin Singh). In International Journal of Development and Conflict 7(2017), pp. 81–96
 Public Policy Agenda: Decrypting Sustainability for India (2016), (Islam, K M B and Raushan A, co-Ed). Bloomsbury
 Educational Policy Reforms: National Perspective (2017). (Islam, K M B and Iftekhar, S. N., co-Ed). Bloomsbury
 New Directions in Media (2015). Eds. K.M. Baharul Islam and Nandita Roy
 Issues in Women's Rights: A Practitioners' Resource Book (2014). K M Baharul Islam (Editor)
 The Delhi rape case : the role of social media in protests and policy change; Dash, BB and Islam, KMB (2017). In From Tahrir Square to Ferguson: Social Networks as Facilitators of Social Movements, Juliet Dee (Editor); New York: Peter Lang. 
 English Language Teaching and Digital Library: An Overview of Resources Available Online (2017). In Digital Library and Open Access Initiatives, K C Satpathy (Ed). Shankar's Book; New Delhi, pp. 29–42.
 Lecturers beyond classrooms: Open Source Avenues for Students (2017) (with K C Satpathy). In Digital Library and Open Access Initiatives, K C Satpathy (Ed). Shankar's Book; New Delhi, pp. 365–75.
 Community based water resources management in North East India : lessons from a global context. Editors: C.K. Jain, K.M. Baharul Islam, Shikhar Sarma.
National ICT Policies and Plans towards Poverty Reduction: Emerging Trends and Issues – Linking PRSP to the National ICT Policies and Plans: A Case Study. UNECA, 2004.
Woman Rights Education, Literacy Online Journal, Pennsylvania
National ICT Policy & Plans for Sierra Leone, UN-ECA, Addis Ababa (2006)
Regional e-Government Framework for East African Community, UNECA, Addis Ababa / EAC, Arusha, Tanzania Publication, 2006
National ICT Policy & Plans for the Gambia, UN-ECA, Addis Ababa (2004)
E-Government Strategy for The Gambia, UN-ECA, Addis Ababa (2004)
Regional ICT Strategy for COMESA (Common Market for Eastern and Southern Africa), U”NECA/COMESA, 2004
Social Justice & Other Issues (Ed), REC Silchar Publication;  Silchar 1998
English for Science & Technology: An Audio Visual Approach (Auth), Shaddhanjali Publications, Silchar, 1997
e-Commerce: Laws and Cyber Crimes, In Road Map Towards a Cyber Crime Deterrent Mechanism (ed.) N. Deka. 2008. SAN,  Guwahati India
Regional Integrated Development in India, Economy Review (Dec 2007), IIPM, New Delhi
ICT for Poverty Reduction: The African Perspective, Encyclopedia of Digital Governance, 2006; Idea Group Inc., Hershey, PA 17033 USA
ICT for Socio-Economic Development: ACTION Model, In African E-Markets. Eds Aida Opoku-Mensah & M. Salih. International Books & UN, The Netherlands, 2007
The African Renaissance, Book Review published in The Ethiopian Review, Oct 2003 Issue.
Problems, prospects and future of education for minorities in India: a case study of Madrassa education in Assam, Management of School Education in India (Ed. Neelam Sood) New Delhi, A.P.H., 2003.
e-Governance: The Indian Experience,  ICT Focus, Vol:2 Issue:3, Nov/03; Addis Ababa
Access & Equity Issues in Crossing the Digital Divide through Open & Distance Learning, AAOU XV Conference Volume, 2002, IGNOU: New Delhi.
ICT for Education in Ethiopia, Ethiopian Herald, June 2003
Making of an Outer Circle in Language: TEFL as an avenue for Gender Sensitisations, ILS Proceedings, 15thAnnual Conference, Addis Ababa University, Addis Ababa; 2003
Computer Networks as Mass Media: Exploring Possibilities of Computer Initiatives in TEFL in Ethiopia (Co-auth: Demisse T.), ILS Proceedings, 15thAnnual Conference, Addis Ababa University, Addis Ababa; 2003
Towards ESP In Ethiopia: A 3D English Language Needs Survey, Proceedings of 2ndInterdisciplinary Conference English Language Teaching, Unity University, Addis Ababa; April 2003
Cultural Content and Foreign Language Acquisition: A Case for Paradigm Shift in Ethiopia, Annual OSSREA Conference, Organization for Social Sciences Research in Eastern and Southern Africa; Addis Ababa June 2003
Woman Rights Education, Literacy Online Journal, Pennsylvania
Open & Distance education for Displaced Persons : An Avenue to social Welfare, Open & Distance Education, Ed. Mukhopadhya, M & M. Parhar, New Delhi 1997

Gallery

See also
 Emergency management#Communicating and incident assessment
 Karimganj
 List of Aligarh Muslim University alumni

References 

Scholars from Assam
Living people
Aligarh Muslim University alumni
Assam University alumni
Tezpur University alumni
Asian Institute of Technology alumni
Alumni of the University of Strathclyde
Gauhati University alumni
Year of birth missing (living people)